Tuparro River is a river of  Colombia found in Vichada Department. It gives its name to El Tuparro National Natural Park. Tuparro is part of the Orinoco River basin.

See also
List of rivers of Colombia

References
Rand McNally, The New International Atlas, 1993.

Rivers of Colombia